Roger de Heyberare (or Roger le Heberer) was the member of Parliament for Gloucester in the Parliament of 1295.

References 

Year of birth missing
Year of death missing
Members of the Parliament of England (pre-1707) for Gloucester